Sangita Kalanidhi Aruna Sairam is an Indian classical vocalist and carnatic music singer. She is a recipient of the Padma Shri award from the Government of India and was elected as the Vice Chairman of the Sangeet Natak Academy (India's premier national institution for music and dance) by the Government of India until 2022. In 2011, Aruna was the first Carnatic musician to perform at the BBC proms in London. She is also the first Carnatic musician to perform in Oud Festival of Israel (Jerusalem).

Early life
Vidhushi Aruna Sairam was born in Mumbai into a Tamil musical family. She received vocal training from her mother Rajalakshmi Sethuraman, who was a student of the Alathur Brothers and Thanjavoor Sankara Iyer. Her father Shri Sethuraman  was a music connoisseur who hosted musicians and dancers in the family home. At one of these gatherings, Aruna met Sangita Kalanidhi Smt. T. Brinda, who trained her in the style of Veena Dhanammal.  Indian-American business executive and former chairman and chief executive officer of PepsiCo, Indra Nooyi, is Aruna's niece.

As a child, Aruna demonstrated an aptitude for music; she won her first gold medal at the age of eight at a competition in Mumbai. At 14 she performed her first full-length solo concert at a local festival. At 21, she won the Best Young Musician Award at the annual conference held at the Music Academy in Chennai, where she began to be noticed.

Over the following years, Aruna performed Carnatic music, drawing on the influences of Mumbai and in a pure classical style. She was influenced by film, western and Hindustani (northern Indian) classical music. She ushered in a new approach to concert presentation, extending the boundaries of the Carnatic repertoire while retaining classical grammar and tradition.

Aruna Sairam has two daughters, Gayathri and Maithreyee. Gayathri Sairam's wedding reception in 2011 was grand, and covered by national media. Maitreyee Krishnaswami (1974-2020) succumbed to cancer in Seattle at the  age of 45.

Training
Aruna Sairam was taught by Sangeeta Kalanithi T.Brinda, and others.

Shri S Ramachandran, from the bani (style) of Chittor Subramanya Pillai, expanded her already wide repertoire and taught her the fine nuances of nereval singing (improvising within poetic texts). A S Mani, a disciple of Tiger Vardacharyar, guided her through the creative process of swara singing (improvising with the sol-fa). Prof T R Subramanyam, an acclaimed music professor at Delhi University, taught Aruna to sing and spontaneously compose within ragam-tanam-pallavi. K S Narayanaswamy, the respected veena singer, taught her the subtlety of gamakas – the microtonal oscillations that mark Carnatic music.

Despite her extensive training, Sairam felt the need for guidance in voice training to become capable of fully expressing her creativity and knowledge through her voice. She met German voice maestro Eugene Rabine, who helped her discover and apply a new sound and emotion to her voice. She later took advice and guidance from Carnatic singer M. Balamuralikrishna. To this day, she remains in touch with the New York-based voice teacher David Jones.

Career

India

Aruna Sairam has performed at the Indian President's official residence – Rashtrapati Bhavan – and the memorials to Indian prime ministers Indira Gandhi at Shakti Sthal and Rajiv Gandhi at Veer Bhoomi. She has also performed across the country at venues including The Music Academy in Chennai, the National Centre for the Performing Arts in Mumbai, Siri Fort Auditorium in Delhi, and at seminars and the festival held at the Indira Gandhi National Centre for the Arts in Delhi, the Music Forum in Mumbai, and the Kolkata's Sangeet Research Academy.

International

Aruna has performed South Indian vocal music internationally. She worked as a visiting professor at a German music conservatory where she taught South Indian music. She was intrigued at the lack of awareness of her art form outside the subcontinent.

This experience gave her a mission to make South Indian classical music global. She performed at the BBC Proms at London's Royal Albert Hall. as the first South Indian classical vocalist in the Proms' then-116-year history in 2011. Sairam has also performed at New York's Carnegie Hall, Paris's Théâtre de la Ville and Morocco's Fes Festival of World Sacred Music.

Collaborations
Aruna Sairam has collaborated with many artists across the globe. Here is a list of some of the artists with whom Sairam has collaborated:

India
• Shankar Mahadevan
• U. Srinivas
• Vid. Neela Bhagwat
• Jayanti Kumaresh
• Coke Studio- Ram Sampath
• Sudha Raghunathan
• Agam Band
• Zakir Hussain
• Ronu Majumdar
• Haricharan
• Thayir Sadam Project  
• Malavika Sarukkai (Dancer)
• Pt. Jayateerth Mevundi • Kaushiki Chakraborty • Padma Subrahmanyam • Gaurav Majumdar • Vivek Sagar

International
• Dominique Vellard
• Michael Riemann
• Christian Bollman
• Hari Sivanesan 
• Nouruddine Tahiri
• Jesse Bannister
• Vijay Iyer
• Rajika Puri (Dancer)
• Soumik Datta 
• Marco Horvat • Rudresh Mahanthappa

Awards and recognitions
Sairam has won many national and international awards, including the Padma Shri and the US Congress Proclamation of Excellence.
She received Chevalier Award by French Government on November 5, 2022.
 Kalidas Samman from the Government of Madhya Pradesh, 2020
 Sangeetha Kalanidhi from the Madras Music Academy, 2018
 Padma Shri from the Government of India, 2009
 Aruna Sairam has been appointed as vice-chairman of the prestigious Sangeet Natak Akademi, Delhi, 2015
 Sangeet Natak Akademi Award, Government of India, 2014
 Isai Mani Magudam Award by Rajalakshmi Fine Arts, Chennai, 2015
 Arsha Kala Bhushanam Award by Arsha Vidya Gurukulam, Coimbatore, 2014
 Rajah Sir Annamalai Chettiar Award by Rajah Sir Annamalai Chettiar Memorial Trust Chennai, 2013
 Shri P. Obul Reddy and Smt. P. Gnanambal Award 2012
 Indira Sivasailam Endowment Award, 2012
 Sangita Kala Nipuna by Mylapore Fine Arts Club, Chennai, 2012
 Sake of Honour Award by Rotary Club of Ambattur 2011
 U S Congress Proclamation of Excellence, 2008
 Gaana Padmam by Brahma Gana Sabha, 2008
 The "Kalaimamani" by the Government of Tamil Nadu, 2006
 The "Isai Selvam" by the Government of Tamil Nadu, 2006
 Sangita Choodamani by Sri Krishna Gana Sabha Chennai, 2006
 Aruna Sairam has been appointed the Advisor to the Department of Culture, Tamil Nadu, on Musical Education by the Chief Minister of Tamil Nadu.

Recordings
, Sairam has recorded over 60 records. Her recordings span classical repertoires, thematic presentations, concert recordings and collaborations with German, French, Moroccan and other international artists. Six of her albums have been produced and distributed in Europe and the US. She has collaborated with artists including French artistry Dominque Vellard and Christian Bollman of Germany, as well as with eminent Hindustani musicians. She has also released "Aruna: Thousand Names of the Divine Mother", an album containing sacred chants from the Lalitha Sahasaranamam.

Teaching
Aruna Sairam has undertaken various mentoring programmes, notably the 2011 BBC World Routes Academy Project by BBC Radio 3, in which she tutored the British-born, South Asian veena player Hari Sivanesan. She also tutored a French singer of medieval chant Marco Horvat under the Indo-French Cultural Exchange Programme.

After her initial stint in the Music Conservatory in Germany, she has continued to teach as guest lecturer in several European schools. She has also taught at Harvard Sangeet, a workshop on Carnatic Music for students of Harvard University, US. She was also appointed by the Chief Minister of Tamil Nadu as an advisor to the Department of Culture, Tamil Nadu, on Musical Education between 2007 and 2011.

She has written a detailed thesis about voice training and she tutors young artists in this subject. In 2014, she was invited as a Faculty to the International Jazz Convention at the Banff Centre, Canada, by its Director Vijay Iyer.

Every year, The Sangeet Research Academy in Kolkata invites Aruna as a mentor and member of its expert committee and as the external examiner for the graduating scholars of the academy.

Foundation

She and her husband have set up the Nadayogam Trust, which gives performance opportunities to young musicians.
Under the Nadayogam Trust, a scholarship scheme has been instituted, through which violins were given to students of S V College of Music and Dance, Tirupati. The trust also maintains an archive of teaching materials and a collection of recordings.

Critical reception
Aruna has been well received by overseas publications across her performances. In 2011, Pulse Connects called her the "darling of Carnatic vocal music" before her performance at the BBC Proms. Outlook Magazine compared her talent to that of famed vocalist M S Subbulakshmi, calling her purity of voice, diction, sruti alignment and singing, similar to those of Subbulakshmi's.

London Evening Standard has called her the "New Queen of Soul", comparing her with Aretha Franklin.

References

External links

Carnatic singers
Recipients of the Padma Shri in arts
Living people
1952 births
Musicians from Tiruchirappalli
Recipients of the Sangeet Natak Akademi Award